Kennedy Meadows may refer to:

 Kennedy Meadows (Tulare), a portion of the Kern Plateau in Tulare County, California
 Kennedy Meadows (CDP) , a census-designated place in Tulare County, California
 Kennedy Meadows Campground, on the Kern Plateau in the Sequoia National Forest
 Kennedy Meadows in the Sonora Pass region of central California